Marko Rajamäki (born 3 October 1968) is a Swedish-born Finnish former footballer and current manager of TPS. He managed Turun Palloseura between 2010 and 2014. Previously he managed the club's under-18 team (since 2002) and was also the assistant manager of the senior team in 2009. Rajamäki is himself a former Finnish international footballer.

He played for several years in the Finnish league and is the league's 23rd all-time top-scorer with 98 goals.

In his time in the Scottish league, Rajamäki played for Greenock Morton (94 league games) in the 1990s. He also played for Hamilton Academical (eight league games) and Livingston (five league games).

Rajamäki made his debut for Morton, on 22 October 1994 along with fellow Finn Janne Lindberg, at Shielfield Park in a 2–1 defeat against Berwick Rangers.

He was appointed manager of TPS in September 2022 after previous manager Jonatan Johansson was sacked.

Honours
Finnish Cup 1991 (Turun Palloseura)
Under-18 Championship 2008 (Turun Palloseura, as a manager)
Coach of the Month: April (2010)
 Scottish Second Division Championship 1995
 Finnish Cup: 2010 (as manager)

Career statistics

International goals

References

External links

1968 births
Living people
People from Gothenburg
Finnish footballers
Finland international footballers
Turun Palloseura footballers
Myllykosken Pallo −47 players
Greenock Morton F.C. players
FSV Zwickau players
Hamilton Academical F.C. players
Livingston F.C. players
Scottish Football League players
Finnish expatriate footballers
Expatriate footballers in Scotland
Expatriate footballers in Germany
Finnish football managers
TPS Turku football managers
Salon Palloilijat players
Association football midfielders
Association football forwards